Morning Star Higher Secondary School, Gudalur, Tamil Nadu, India, is a co-educational institution established on 25 May 1991 under the management of CMI (Carmelites of Mary Immaculate) fathers of St. Thomas Provinces, Kozhikode.

Morning Star School has an idyllic setting, nestled in the green hills of the Nilgiris at the foothills of the Western Ghats, surrounded by tea and coffee plantations. The school is on the border of three southern states and is accessible from Coimbatore, Ooty, Bangalore, Mysore and Kozhikode. It is affiliated to the Central Board of Secondary Education (CBSE), New Delhi.

School motto

"Bliss through Wisdom" is the motto.

See also

 Amity International School, Gurgaon
 List of international schools in India

References

External links
 Morning Star Higher Secondary School

Carmelite educational institutions
Catholic secondary schools in India
International schools in India
Christian schools in Tamil Nadu
Primary schools in Tamil Nadu
High schools and secondary schools in Tamil Nadu
Schools in Nilgiris district
Educational institutions established in 1991
1991 establishments in Tamil Nadu